The 2007 Acura Sports Car Challenge of Mid Ohio was the seventh round of the 2007 American Le Mans Series season. It took place at the Mid-Ohio Sports Car Course on July 21, 2007.

Official results
Class winners in bold.  Cars failing to complete 70% of winner's distance marked as Not Classified (NC).

Statistics
 Pole Position - #7 Penske Racing - 1:08.510
 Fastest Lap - #7 Penske Racing - 1:10.113
 Margin of Victory - 2.360

External links
  

S
Sports Car Challenge of Mid-Ohio
2007 in sports in Ohio